Timothy A. Salthouse is the Brown-Forman professor of Psychology in the Department of Psychology at the University of Virginia where he leads the Cognitive Aging Laboratory.

Education 
In 1974, Salthouse received his PhD from the University of Michigan.

Research
At the Cognitive Aging Laboratory, a major focus is the Virginia Cognitive Aging Project (VCAP),  one of the largest longitudinal assessments of cognitive aging.

In his research, Salthouse helped discover that the first indicators of cognitive decline (regarding brain speed, reasoning, and visual problem-solving ability) start in one's late 20s.

Honors
Salthouse  is a Fellow of the American Psychological Association, the Association for Psychological Science, the American Association for the Advancement of Science and other organisations.

His awards include the William James Fellow Award from the Association for Psychological Science in 1998 and the Lifetime Achievement Award of the International Society for Intelligence Research in 2012.

Published works
Salthouse has authored or co-authored and published over 200 articles in academic journals. His h-index according to Google Scholar is 84.

Selected books

References

Year of birth missing (living people)
Living people
Intelligence researchers
20th-century American psychologists
Experimental psychologists
University of Virginia faculty
University of California, Santa Barbara alumni
University of Michigan alumni
Fellows of the American Psychological Association
Fellows of the American Association for the Advancement of Science
Fellows of the Association for Psychological Science
Brown–Forman people
21st-century American psychologists
American textbook writers